Qarah Bolagh (also Romanized as Qarah Bolāgh and Qareh Bolāgh; also known as Karbala) is a village in Saidabad Rural District, in the Central District of Ijrud County, Zanjan Province, Iran. At the 2006 census, its population was 4, in 4 families.

See also 
 Karbala, the city in Iraq
 Karbala, Fars
 Karbala, Iran

References 

Populated places in Ijrud County